Mount Plymouth or Mount Osorno is a conspicuous peak rising to 520 m in the northeast extremity of Dryanovo Heights, Greenwich Island in the South Shetland Islands, Antarctica.  The peak has precipitous and partly ice-free northern slopes, and surmounts Teteven Glacier to the northwest, Quito Glacier to the northeast and Traub Glacier to the southeast.

The feature was charted by the Discovery Investigations and named after the city of Plymouth, England.

Location

See also
 Dryanovo Heights
 Greenwich Island

Maps
 L.L. Ivanov et al. Antarctica: Livingston Island and Greenwich Island, South Shetland Islands. Scale 1:100000 topographic map. Sofia: Antarctic Place-names Commission of Bulgaria, 2005.
 L.L. Ivanov. Antarctica: Livingston Island and Greenwich, Robert, Snow and Smith Islands. Scale 1:120000 topographic map.  Troyan: Manfred Wörner Foundation, 2009.

References
 SCAR Composite Antarctic Gazetteer.

Mountains of Greenwich Island